Tabia Charles (born 6 April 1985 in Toronto, Ontario, Canada) is a Canadian long jumper.

She finished tenth in the final round at the 2008 Olympic Games.

Her personal best is 6.82 metres, achieved in June 2008 in Chania. This is the current Canadian record. She also has 14.02 metres in the triple jump, achieved in March 2007 in South Bend; her outdoor personal best is 13.94 metres, achieved in April 2006 in Philadelphia.

On October 4, 2018, The University of Miami announced that Tabia Charles-Collins will be one of eight athletes inducted into the Sports Hall of Fame as part of its 51st Annual ceremony. The Class of 2019 ceremony is set to take place in April 2019.

References

1985 births
Living people
Canadian female long jumpers
Black Canadian female track and field athletes
Athletes (track and field) at the 2008 Summer Olympics
Olympic track and field athletes of Canada
Athletes (track and field) at the 2010 Commonwealth Games
Athletes from Toronto
Commonwealth Games medallists in athletics
Commonwealth Games bronze medallists for Canada
Medallists at the 2010 Commonwealth Games